Turmoil & Tinfoil is the third studio album by American bluegrass musician Billy Strings, following Fiddle Tune X and preceding Home. Released on September 22,2017, it reached number three on the Billboard Bluegrass Albums chart, remaining in that position for seven consecutive weeks.

Turmoil & Tinfoil reached number eighteen on the Billboard Heatseekers chart.

Band members included Brad Tucker on upright bass, Drew Matulich on mandolin, and Billy Failing on 5 string banjo.

Overview and meaning
The album covers a great range of topics including racism, drug addiction, relationships and even suicide.

Reception

Turmoil & Tinfoil received generally positive reviews. Garret K. Woodward of Rolling Stone described the collection as "[not] afraid to look forward or celebrate youth."

Track listing

References

2017 albums
Billy Strings albums